Cry Liberty is a play by the British writer Esther McCracken. After a premiere at the Theatre Royal, Newcastle, the work's West End at the Vaudeville Theatre lasted for 26 performances from 21 April to 13 May 1950. It was considerably less successful than McCracken's pre-war and wartime hits such as Quiet Wedding and No Medals. The original cast included Irene Handl, Joyce Barbour, Edwin Styles and Anthony Sharp.

Original cast
Colonel Colin Craven - Edwin Styles
Geraldine Craven - Judith Tatham
Martin Woodhouse -	Dan Cunningham
Mr Blott - Michael Godley
Mr Clements - Michael Gover
Mr Horder - Ian Jarvis
Mrs Daggett - Joyce Barbour
Mrs Horder	- Elizabeth Bird
Mrs Thripp	- Irene Handl
Penelope Woodhouse	- Julia Braddock
Removal Man - 	Frank Sieman
Thripp	- Douglas Jefferies
William Hampton -	Anthony Sharp

References

Bibliography
 Wearing, J.P. The London Stage 1950-1959: A Calendar of Productions, Performers, and Personnel.  Rowman & Littlefield, 2014.

1950 plays
Plays by Esther McCracken
Plays set in England
West End plays